Tadeusz Wojciechowski (b. 13 June 1838 in Kraków, d. 21 November 1919 in Lwów) was a Polish historian, professor, and rector of the University of Lwów (now Lviv, Ukraine; then in the Austro-Hungary). One of the founders of the Polish Historical Society and a member of the Academy of Learning. Medievalist. Deputy to the Austrian Herrenhaus. Buried at the Lychakivskiy Cemetery.

Works 
 Chrobacja, rozbiór starożytności słowiańskich (Kraków 1873),
 O Rocznikach polskich X-XV wieku (1880),
 O Kazimierzu Mnichu (1881),
 O życiu i pismach Wincentego z Kielc (1881),
 Co to jest historia i po co się jej uczymy (1883),
 Podział i zakres dziejów polskich (1884),
 O powtórnej elekcji Stanisława Leszczyńskiego w r. 1733 (Charakterystyka rządów Augusta II) (1887),
 Co Al Bekri opowiadał o Słowianach i ich sąsiadach (1887),
 Bonifatius der Apostel der Deutschen und die Slaven-apostel Konstantinus (Cyrillus) und Methodius (1888),
 O Piaście i piaście (1895),
 Kościół katedralny w Krakowie (1899),
 Eremici reguły św. Romualda, czyli benedyktyni włoscy w Polsce XI wieku (1902),
 Najdawniejszy znany obecnie polski akt książęcy z r. 1081-1086 (1902),
 Szkice historyczne XI wieku (1904),
 Plemię Kadłubka (1909),

1838 births
1919 deaths
20th-century Polish historians
Polish male non-fiction writers
University of Lviv rectors
19th-century Polish historians